Limborelia exquisita, also known as the exquisite palmleaf snail, is a species of palmleaf snail that is endemic to Australia's Lord Howe Island in the Tasman Sea.

Description
The shell of adult snails is 7–8.5 mm in height, with a diameter of 4–6 mm. It is smooth, yellow-brown to dark brown in colour, with a pointed spire. The animal has a cream to brown body.

Habitat
The snail is found across the island in rainforest and woodland in leaf litter, especially fallen palm leaves, mainly below an elevation of 500 m.

References

External links
 Pfeiffer, L. (1855). A monograph of the genera Realia and Hydrocena. Proceedings of the Zoological Society of London. 22 (278) (“1854”): 304; 22 (279) (“1854”): 305–309 
 Crosse H. (1868). Diagnoses Molluscorum novorum. Journal de Conchyliologie. 16(2): 174-178

 
exquisita
Gastropods of Lord Howe Island
Taxa named by Ludwig Karl Georg Pfeiffer
Gastropods described in 1855